Aatolana schioedtei is a species of crustaceans in the family Cirolanidae, first described by Edward J. Miers in 1884 as Cirolana schioedtei. In 1993, Bruce reasssigned the species to the genus, Aatolana. 

It is benthic shrimp found in tropical waters at depths of 16 m to 173 m off the coasts of Western Australia, the Northern Territory, and Queensland.

References

External links 

 Aatolana schioedtei occurrence data from GBIF

Cymothoida
Crustaceans of Australia
Crustaceans described in 1884
Taxa named by Edward J. Miers